The  Boeing T60 (company designation Model 520) was a family of small turboshaft/turboprop engines produced by Boeing, based on Boeing's earlier Model 500 gas generator and Model 502 (T50) turboshaft engines.

Variants
YT60-BO-2AMilitary turboshaft version for testing.
520-2(YT60-BO-2A) Free power turbine turboshaft rated at 
520-4Turboprop rated at 
520-6Direct drive turboshaft rated at  military power
520-8Turboprop rated at

Specifications (520-6)

See also

References

 
 

1950s turboshaft engines